Arūnas Klimavičius (born 5 October 1982 in Panevėžys) is a Lithuanian former professional footballer and chairman of the Lithuanian Professional Footballers' Association.

Career
On 17 February, it was revealed on the Hearts website that he was having a trial with the Scottish Premier League side. On 8 December 2009 the 27-year-old Lithuanian defender has signed a two-year deal with Sibir.
In 2011, he signed for Kazakhstani side FC Zhetysu.

In December 2014, Klimavičius moved to FC Tobol.

International career
Klimavičius played 8 games at UEFA Euro 2008 qualifying.

International goals
Scores and results list Lithuania's goal tally first.

Post-playing career
After the 2019 season finished, Arūnas retired from professional football. In January 2020, Klimavičius had been hired as a tennis coach. On 28 January 2020, he also founded and became the president of the Association of Professional Footballers (PFA - Profesionalių futbolininkų asociacija). The association was established to unionize Lithuanian professional footballers, properly represent their interests and provide them with qualified assistance.

Klimavičius covered the UEFA Euro 2020 as a studio analyst on LNK. In November 2021, he became the host of the podcast about Lithuanian football "PadkaStas".

Personal life
He is the son of Albertas Klimavičius and the brother of Linas Klimavičius.

Honours
Ekranas
A Lyga: 2005
Lithuanian Supercup: 2006

Lithuania
Baltic Cup: 2005, 2010

References

External links
 Rfpl stats
 FC Dynamo Moscow  profile

1982 births
Living people
Sportspeople from Panevėžys
Lithuanian footballers
Lithuania international footballers
Association football defenders
Lithuanian expatriate footballers
FK Ekranas players
FK Riteriai players
FC Dynamo Moscow players
FC Ural Yekaterinburg players
FC Sibir Novosibirsk players
FC Zhetysu players
FC Aktobe players
FC Tobol players
FK Jonava players
FK Kauno Žalgiris players
A Lyga players
Russian Premier League players
Kazakhstan Premier League players
Expatriate footballers in Russia
Lithuanian expatriate sportspeople in Russia
Expatriate footballers in Kazakhstan
Lithuanian expatriate sportspeople in Kazakhstan